Matthew Vincent Walsh (born December 2, 1982) is an American former professional basketball player who played in several leagues across the world for ten seasons. He played college basketball at Florida.

Early years
Walsh was born in Philadelphia. He attended Germantown Academy, a private preparatory school in Fort Washington, Pennsylvania, where he played high school basketball for the Germantown Academy Patriots.

College career
Walsh accepted an athletic scholarship to attend the University of Florida in Gainesville, Florida, where he played for coach Billy Donovan's Florida Gators basketball team for three seasons from 2002 to 2005.  As a junior, Walsh suffered torn left ankle ligaments and missed several games, but recovered to lead the Gators to the Southeastern Conference (SEC) tournament championship and the second round of the 2005 NCAA Men's Division I Basketball Tournament.

Professional career
The Miami Heat originally signed Walsh as an undrafted free agent out of the University of Florida in 2005. He was then waived on November 18, 2005, after playing in two NBA regular season games. In the 2006 NBA preseason, he was signed by the New Jersey Nets, and they then released him in October.

In the 2006-07 season, Walsh played with Olympia Larissa in the Greek League, having a successful year for both the team and himself. He was considered one of the most valuable players in the Greek League that year, and he was also the second best scorer of the competition, averaging 17.8 points per game. Walsh also played with the Cleveland Cavaliers in the NBA Summer League in 2007, and he later signed a one-year contract with Bàsquet Manresa of the Spanish ACB League.

In August 2009, Walsh signed with the Adriatic League club Union Olimpija. In February 2010, he joined the Greek League club Aris. On October 25, 2010 he signed a one-year contract with ASVEL Lyon-Villeurbanne in France.

In November 2011 Walsh signed with UCAM Murcia in Spain. On January 6, 2012, he signed with Saski Baskonia, also in Spain.

In August 2012, Walsh signed with Spirou Charleroi of Belgium. In February 2013, he joined Brose Baskets Bamberg. On August 2, 2013, he signed a two-year deal with Virtus Bologna. On August 13, 2014, he signed with Eskişehir Basket.

On September 24, 2015, Walsh officially announced his retirement from professional basketball.

On February 25, 2018, it was announced that Walsh was heading a consortium to purchase the New Zealand Breakers of the NBL, along with business partners Adam Goodman, Romie Chaudhari, former NBA All-Star Shawn Marion, and Barstool Sports bloggers Dan "Big Cat" Katz, PFT Commenter, and Hank Lockwood.

Career statistics

NBA

Source

Regular season

|-
| style="text-align:left;"|
| style="text-align:left;"|Miami
| 2 || 0 || 1.5 || 1.000 || – || .000 || .0 || .0 || .0 || .0 || 1.0

See also

 List of Florida Gators in the NBA

References

External links

 NBA Stats @ basketball-reference.com
 Euroleague.net Profile
 Spanish League Profile 
 Belgian League profile

1982 births
Living people
ABA League players
American expatriate basketball people in Belgium
American expatriate basketball people in France
American expatriate basketball people in Germany
American expatriate basketball people in Greece
American expatriate basketball people in Italy
American expatriate basketball people in Slovenia
American expatriate basketball people in Spain
American expatriate basketball people in Turkey
American expatriate basketball people in Ukraine
American men's basketball players
Aris B.C. players
Arkansas RimRockers players
ASVEL Basket players
Basketball players from Pennsylvania
BC Azovmash players
Bàsquet Manresa players
Brose Bamberg players
CB Murcia players
Eskişehir Basket players
Florida Gators men's basketball players
Germantown Academy alumni
Greek Basket League players
KK Olimpija players
Liga ACB players
Miami Heat players
Olympia Larissa B.C. players
Saski Baskonia players
Shooting guards
Small forwards
Spirou Charleroi players
Sportspeople from Bucks County, Pennsylvania
Undrafted National Basketball Association players
Virtus Bologna players